Nikki Blakk (born November 7, 1972) is an American Radio DJ, who pioneered San Francisco Bay Area's rock radio station, 107.7 The Bone. She was the host of afternoon drive for 5 years, and was the more vibrant evening on-air personality, Assistant Program Director, host and programmer of the station's Friday night program of heavy and extreme metal music called "The Metal Zone".

She is a well-known figure in the San Francisco Bay Area's metal scene, and regularly interviews popular recording artists, including members of Cannibal Corpse, Metallica, Judas Priest, Exodus, Slayer, Suicide Silence, Anthrax, Black Label Society, Megadeth, Testament, Amon Amarth, Trivium, Children of Bodom, and others.

Early life 

Nikki Blakk was born on Travis Air Force Base in Fairfield, California.  She attended Fairfield High School, Solano Community College and San Francisco State University, majoring in Broadcast Electronic Communication Arts, finishing in 2001.  She is of Scottish, Cherokee, Irish, French and German ancestry.

Radio career 

Blakk began her career as an intern at KSAN, a precursor to 107.7 The Bone, working in promotions and marketing.  Immediately after, she went to KNBR in San Francisco and became a production assistant, call screener and board op for the next year and a half while finishing college.

She was hired at Rock 96.7, a Clear Channel station in Modesto, California, as a weekend personality, then midday host.  Her first audition shift as full-time DJ was on September 11, 2001, board-oping the news all day then going live the next day, which was a challenge that she handled extremely well and was subsequently hired as a full-time weekday on-air personality. But, after 9/11, advertising revenue dropped significantly, and Rock 96.7 decided to cut Nikki's live weekday in favor of pre-recorded voice tracking.

While she was recording at the KSJO studios in San Jose, California, Zakk Tyler, the afternoon drive jock gave her audition CD to the program director, Gary Shoenwetter, who was impressed and hired her for weekends, noting the "Big Hair Ball", an '80's rock program. In late 2003, Nikki took over the weekday evening shift and created a heavy metal program "Midnight Metal" airing Wed-Fri from midnight-1am.

In October 2004 KSJO flipped format, becoming a Spanish language channel.  Dave Mustaine was in the car when Nikki heard the news, and offered to pray for her.

She then had a short stint at 101.7 KXFX The Fox in Santa Rosa, before coming back to 107.7 The Bone on weekends in June 2005. Nikki took over the Afternoon Drive shift on Valentine's Day 2006. In June 2011, The Bone hired Program Director Derek Madden for afternoons, and moved Nikki to the evening, where she developed a variety of programming that included live comedian and musician interviews, a call-in talk show for love advice called "Ask A Hot Chick" and became Assistant Program Director to the station. Nikki Blakk gave her notice of resignation on the Ides of March, 2015 and officially left 107.7 The Bone the following April Fool's Day.
She later came back to 107.7 The Bone on December 5th, 2022

Metal Zone 

At KSJO, Nikki started a metal program originally called Hardcore Hell, later rebranded Midnight Metal 12am – 1am airing Wednesday through Friday nights.  After coming to The Bone, Nikki was a natural to take over the Metal Zone from Billy Steel when he left the station in summer of 2006.  The program aired from 10pm-1am Friday nights and featured extreme music with special emphasis on local artists. The Metal Zone was canceled after Nikki's resignation in 2015. Live 365, an internet radio company rebranded the 24 hour heavy metal channel "Nikki Blakk's Metal Zone" programmed and hosted by Nikki Blakk, which ended when the company went out of business in December 2015.

Personal life 

Nikki Blakk also has a simultaneous career as backstage manager and production runner at LiveNation, formerly Bill Graham Presents, where she has taken care of artists and production needs at San Francisco's Warfield, Fillmore, and virtually every other Bay Area Live Nation venue, working with everyone from Green Day to the Grateful Dead, Madonna to Motörhead.

Nikki has also been voted one of the Top 50 Hottest Women in Radio for 2009, 2010 and 2011, according to Pop Crunch.

She has been involved in the Greater Bay Area Make-A-Wish Foundation and the Guitar Player Magazine Guitar Superstar contest.

References 

https://www.facebook.com/nikki.blakk

External links 
 Nikki Blakk's 107.7 The Bone Profile
 107.7 The Bone Metal Zone Official Page
 Nikki Blakk Youtube Page

1972 births
Living people
People from Fairfield, California
San Francisco State University alumni